Garver is a surname. Notable people with the surname include:

Abe Garver, American investment banker
Chris Garver (born 1970), American tattoo artist
John F. Garver (1878-1949), American leader in the Reorganized Church of Jesus Christ of Latter Day Saints
Kathy Garver (born 1945), American television, stage, screen, and voice actress
Lori Garver (born 1961), Deputy NASA Administrator
Mitch Garver (born 1991), American baseball player
Ned Garver (1925–2017), American baseball player
Newton Garver (1928-2014), American philosopher
William Lincoln Garver, American socialist, architect, and author

See also
 Garver-Rentschler Barn - a historic building in Hamilton, Ohio
 Garber (disambiguation) - surname